The Hertsa region, also known as the Hertza region, is a region around the town of Hertsa within Chernivtsi Raion in the southern part of Chernivtsi Oblast in southwestern Ukraine, near the border with Romania.

History
The territory, historically part of Moldavia, was one of the five districts of Dorohoi County. Following the Molotov–Ribbentrop Pact of August 23, 1939, the Soviet Union issued on June 26, 1940, an ultimatum to Romania that threatened the use of force. The Romanian government, responding to the Soviet ultimatum, agreed to withdraw from the territories to avoid a military conflict. A few days later, Bessarabia and Northern Bukovina were occupied by the Soviet Union, and the Hertsa region was attached to the Ukrainian Soviet Socialist Republic. As it was not mentioned in the ultimatum, the annexation of the Hertsa region was not consented to by Romania. The region (together with the rest of Bessarabia and Bukovina) was recaptured by Romania during 1941–1944 in the course of the Axis attack on the Soviet Union in World War II, until the Red Army captured it again in 1944. Soviet annexation of this territory was internationally recognized by the Paris Peace Treaties in 1947.

Romania and Ukraine have signed and ratified a border agreement and are signatories of international treaties and alliances that denounce any territorial claims. Romanian organisations in the region consider Hertsa to be historically Romanian, detached from it by the Soviet Union in 1940 in violation of international law. The correspondent of "New Region", Sergei Vulpe, with reference to the Bucharest newspaper Ziua reported on April 17, 2008 that the President of Romania, Traian Băsescu, stated that if Ukraine wants to annex Transnistria, then they should return Southern Bessarabia (Budjak) and northern Bukovina (Chernivtsi Oblast that includes the Hertsa region) to Moldova.

See also
 Moldavia
 Bessarabia
 Bukovina

References

External links
  (Hertsa region Romanian organization protests against Ukrainian changes to its status as a raion.)
  (One of the original authors of the Ukrainian Constitution speaks about the Hertsa region.)

Moldavia
Geography of Chernivtsi Oblast
Historical regions in Ukraine
Romanian-speaking countries and territories
Romanian diaspora in Ukraine
Romania–Soviet Union relations
Romania–Ukraine border
Territorial disputes of the Soviet Union